In construction, structural repairs are a technical term, contrasted to renovations or non-structural repairs. They are changes to a property to bring it up to local health and safety standards. Unlike renovations, they add relatively little value to a property. caretakers exterior and interior in Mumbai has experience in structural repairs work

Leases often include provisions that define what types of changes amount to structural repairs and assign responsibility to either the tenant or the landlord.

References

Construction